Yogoda Satsanga Palpara Mahavidyalaya is an undergraduate liberal arts college in Palpara, Purba Medinipur district, in West Bengal, India. It is affiliated with the Vidyasagar University. Prior to 1981, it was affiliated with the University of Calcutta.

History
It was in the year 1950 that Palpara M.E. School was raised to the High School standard and the Palpara High School affiliated to Yogoda Satsanga Society of India afterwards, Yogoda Satsanga Palpara High School was upgraded into a Higher Secondary and multipurpose school (for boys). It is hereworth mentioning that the present college was first housed in the school building in 1964. Under Y.S.S. of India, Sri Janardan Sahu, through whose untiring and selfless efforts this College was established at Palpara, was the heart, pillar and soul of this and he became the first founder-Secretary of the institutions. He took the initiative in disseminating the light of education and loosened his purse-strings instantly for the cause of higher education in this educationally backward rural area of Palpara.

After independence, the establishment of a college in the far north of Contai Sub Division (Dist. Purba Medinipur) was a crying need. The students had either to go to Medinipur or to Kolkata to pursue their higher studies. More than 80% of the students had to give up their higher education due to excessive cost of living of the urban areas.

Yogoda Satsanga Palpara Mahavidyalaya, a premier Educational Institution under the auspices of Yogoda Satsanga Society of India and Self-Realization Fellowship is situated in the remote south-west corner from the head quarter of the district Purba Medinipur, West Bengal.

Departments

Science
Chemistry
Computer Science
Physics
Mathematics
Botany
Zoology
Physiology

Arts
Bengali
English
Sanskrit
History
Geography
Political Science
Philosophy
Economics

Accreditation
In 2012, Yogoda Satsanga Palpara Mahavidyalaya has been re-accredited and awarded B grade by the National Assessment and Accreditation Council (NAAC). The college is also recognized by the University Grants Commission (UGC).

See also

References

External links
Yogoda Satsanga Palpara Mahavidyalaya
Vidyasagar University
University Grants Commission
National Assessment and Accreditation Council

Colleges affiliated to Vidyasagar University
Educational institutions established in 1964
Universities and colleges in Purba Medinipur district
1964 establishments in West Bengal